Uthamaputhiran is a 2010 Indian Tamil-language romantic action comedy film directed by Mithran Jawahar. A remake of the 2008 Telugu film Ready, it stars Dhanush and Genelia, reprising her role from the original version; the supporting cast includes Vivek, K. Bhagyaraj, Ashish Vidyarthi and Jaya Prakash Reddy (who was also part of the original film) among others with Shriya Saran in a cameo. The film received positive reviews from critics, ended up as a commercial success among 2010 Deepavali releases along with Mynaa. The film was dubbed into Hindi as Rakhwala No. 1 in 2012,.

Plot
Siva (Dhanush) is a happy-go-lucky young boy in a large family. The head of this family are three brothers: Raghupathi (K. Bhagyaraj), Raghavan (Vijay Babu), and Rajaram (Vivekvasu Nagalla). One of the brothers is Siva's father. Siva studies from a hostel away from home. He is always helpful and always comes in when others need him. In one of his obliging acts, he helps his cousin Kalpana (Shriya Saran) elope with her lover against the family's choice. This aggravates the family, and they are asked to forget all about him.

On another occasion, he is asked to help a friend in a love marriage. Siva kidnaps Pooja (Genelia) on a mistaken identity from the marriage hall. When Pooja is kidnapped, her uncles Periyamuthu Gounder (Ashish Vidyarthi) and Chinnamuthu Gounder (Jaya Prakash Reddy) and their henchmen follow them. Pooja, while on the run, tells Siva that she was not interested in the wedding and that her uncles are forcing her marriage with one of their sons, only to seize her properties. When Siva went to kidnap her, she was thinking of how to run away from this marriage. While escaping from Pooja's uncles, Siva brings Pooja to his house under a false identity. Soon, Siva falls in love with Pooja and determines to marry her only with the consent of all the members of both families. When Siva's family along with Pooja visit a temple, her uncle kidnaps her and locks her away in his house.

To save Pooja, Siva joins Emotional Ekambaram (Vivek) – the auditor of Pooja's uncles – as an assistant. He makes Ekambaram believe that he is capable of creating new worlds with characters of their own. Ekambaram then "creates" two American billionaires and with the help of Siva, convinces the two uncles to marry their sons to the daughters of these billionaires. To prove that they are real and not merely the figment of Ekambaram's imagination, Siva asks his parents and his uncles and aunts to play the role. They manage to win the Gounders' hearts and bring about a change in their behavior.

Then, with the consent of all the family members, Siva marries Pooja.

Cast

 Dhanush as Sivaramakrishnan / Dhandapani
 Genelia as Pooja Padmanabhan (Voice dubbed by Savitha Reddy)
 Vivek as 'Emotional' Ekambaram (Auditor)
 K. Bhagyaraj as Raghupathi / (Washington Vetrivel)
 Ashish Vidyarthi as Periyamuthu Gounder
 Jaya Prakash Reddy as Chinnamuthu Gounder
 Sundarrajan as Sundaram
 Karunas as Janaki
 Vijay Babu as Raghavan / (Chicago Shakthivel)
 Vivekvasu Nagalla as Rajaram
 Charuhasan as Swamiji
 Mayilsamy as Santhosh Khan
 Srinath as David
 Rajendran as Velu
 Ambika as Sivakaami
 Rekha as Meenakshi
 Rajyalakshmi as Lakshmi Raghupathi
 Nithya as Bharatham Sundaram
 Uma as Sundari Raghavan
 Aarthi as Raji / Gundumani
 Sonia as Lalitha alias Lallu
 Pandu as Swamiji's assistant
 Master Bharath as Chinna Moorthy Gounder
 Surekha Vani as Chinna Moorthy Gounder's mother
 Rajesh Lingam
 Shriya Saran as Kalpana (Guest appearance)

Soundtrack 

The soundtrack, composed by Vijay Antony, was released on 5 October 2010 in Chennai. The album consists of 6 tracks overall.

Release
The film was released on Diwali alongside Arjun's Vallakottai, Mynaa, and Va Quarter Cutting. The film netted approximately  58 lakh in three days from Chennai city and  67 lakh from Salem area on its opening weekend. It was hat-trick victory for Dhanush-Mithran combination. The film was however banned in western districts of Tamil Nadu. Upon release, Vivek's dialogues relating to the business community Kounder and scenes pertaining to the community were removed. People of the Kongu caste disrupted the screening of the film as the film made negative remarks against their caste.

Home media
The satellite rights of the film were sold to Sun TV.

References

External links 
 

Tamil remakes of Telugu films
2010 films
2010s Tamil-language films
Indian romantic comedy films
Films scored by Vijay Antony
Films shot in Tamil Nadu
Films shot in Switzerland
Films shot in Venice
2010 romantic comedy films
Films directed by Mithran R. Jawahar